Oxyna parietina is a species of fruit fly in the family Tephritidae.

Distribution
United Kingdom & Finland, South to France, Bulgaria & Kazakhstan.

Ecology
Larvae develop in the stems of Artemisia vulgaris.

References

Tephritinae
Flies described in 1758
Muscomorph flies of Europe